Péhékanhouébli is a village in the far west of Ivory Coast. It is in the sub-prefecture of Tiobly, Toulépleu Department, Cavally Region, Montagnes District. The village serves as a border crossing with Liberia; the border is 400 metres southwest of the edge of the village.

Péhékanhouébli was a commune until March 2012, when it became one of 1126 communes nationwide that were abolished.

Notes

Former communes of Ivory Coast
Populated places in Montagnes District
Ivory Coast–Liberia border crossings
Populated places in Cavally Region